The 1933 Stanford Indians football team represented Stanford University in the 1933 college football season. In head coach Tiny Thornhill's first season, the Indians allowed only 36 points during the entire regular season and logged four shutout victories. The team was Pacific Coast Conference co-champions with Oregon and was selected to represent the conference in the Rose Bowl.

Heavy favorites in the Rose Bowl against Columbia, the Indians, led by quarterback Frank Alustiza and fullback Bobby Grayson, dominated the line of scrimmage, with Grayson rushing for 152 yards on 28 carries, more than the entire Columbia team—but eight fumbles and a stiff goal line defense by Columbia kept Stanford from scoring, and the lone score, via a hidden ball play, gave the Lions the upset.

After the prior year's devastating loss to rival USC, the Stanford freshmen of that game — led by Alustiza — vowed never again to lose to the Trojans. The "Vow Boys," as they and their team were called, kept the vow for three years, beginning with a 13–7 road victory over the 1933 USC team. The game was USC's first loss in 27 contests, and Stanford's victory paved their way to the Rose Bowl.

Among the "Vow Boys" was David Packard, found of Hewlett-Packard

Schedule

References

Stanford
Stanford Cardinal football seasons
Pac-12 Conference football champion seasons
Stanford Indians football